Let's Be Fashionable is a lost 1920 American silent comedy film directed by Lloyd Ingraham and written by Mildred Considine and Luther Reed. The film stars Douglas MacLean, Doris May, Wade Boteler, Grace Morse, George Webb, and Wilbur Higby. The film was released on June 13, 1920, by Paramount Pictures.

Cast
Douglas MacLean as Henry Langdon
Doris May as Evelyn Langdon
Wade Boteler as John Hammond
Grace Morse as Elsie Hammond
George Webb as Bruce Grey
Wilbur Higby as George Barrymore
Mollie McConnell as Mrs. Trude 
Norris Johnson as Betty Turner

References

External links

1920 films
1920s English-language films
Silent American comedy films
1920 comedy films
Paramount Pictures films
Films directed by Lloyd Ingraham
American black-and-white films
American silent feature films
Lost American films
1920 lost films
Lost comedy films
1920s American films